The Marcus P. Beebe Library, located at Main St. and 2nd Ave. in Ipswich, South Dakota, was built in 1930–1931.  It is also known as the Ipswich Public Library.  It was listed on the National Register of Historic Places in 1977.

Architect Allen E. Erickson designed the building and it was built under supervision of John D. Williams.  It is a one-and-a-half-story half-timbered Tudor Revival building with walls made of granite stone.

References

National Register of Historic Places in South Dakota
Tudor Revival architecture in the United States
Library buildings completed in 1931
Edmunds County, South Dakota
Libraries in South Dakota